Tony Cottrell, better known as Hi-Tek (born May 5, 1976), is an American rapper and record producer from Cincinnati, Ohio. He is best known for his work with Talib Kweli. His father is singer Willie Cottrell of the Willie Cottrell Band, whom Hi-Tek featured on his second album, Hi-Teknology 2.

Career

1996-2000
Hi-Tek started his career with hip hop group Mood and had a regional hit with "Hustle on the Side". That song was made for Mood's album Doom, which featured amongst others Brooklyn MC Talib Kweli. Hi-Tek went on to produce most of Talib Kweli and Mos Def's Black Star (1998). In 2000, Tek and Kweli (under the name Reflection Eternal) released Train of Thought (2000) on Rawkus Records, with raps by Kweli and beats by Hi-Tek. It enjoyed moderate crossover radio success with the singles "The Blast" and "Move Somethin'". Reflection Eternal released a follow-up album titled Revolutions Per Minute on May 18, 2010.

2001-current
After signing to Rawkus Records, Hi-Tek produced for a number of the labels projects, including the  popular Soundbombing series; a three-record compilation of mostly Rawkus-based artists. In 2001, he released his solo album Hi-Teknology on Rawkus. The album featured appearances by Mos Def, Talib Kweli, Common, Vinia Mojica, Buckshot, and others, with all production handled by Hi-Tek. It received critical acclaim and spawned a minor hit, "Round and Round" with Cincinnati singer Jonell.

Hi-Tek is a staff producer for Aftermath Entertainment and its affiliates, as well as past associates such as Kweli and Mos Def.  He has also recorded songs for Dion Jenkins, an R&B singer signed to Aftermath. Hi-Teknology 2 was released October 17, 2006 on Babygrande, and distributed by Koch Entertainment. The producer released the third installment, Hi-Teknology 3: Underground on December 11, 2007.

In November 2015, producer 9th Wonder announced Hi-Tek as the newest member of The Soul Council - the production staff of his record label It's A Wonderful World Music Group.

Discography

Albums

Production
213 - "Twist Yo Body" (Album: The Hard Way) (2004)
50 Cent - "Best Friend" (Album: Get Rich Or Die Tryin' soundtrack) (2005)
50 Cent - "Get In My Car" (Album: The Massacre) (2005)
50 Cent - "Ryder Music" (Album: The Massacre) (2005)
Anderson .Paak - "Come Down" (2016) 
Beanie Sigel - "Get That Dough" (2000)
Big L featuring C-Town - "Still Here" (2000)
Bishop Lamont - "Friends" (2009)
Bizarre featuring Obie Trice - "Doctor Doctor" (Album: Hannicap Circus) (2005)
Bizarre featuring Eminem - "Hip Hop" (Album: Hannicap Circus) (2005)
Bizarre - "I'm In Luv Witchu" (Album: Hanni Cap Circus) (2005)
Blackalicious - "It's Going Down" (Album: Blazing Arrow) (2002)
Black Star - 6 tracks from Black Star
Black Star featuring Common - "Respiration"
Boot Camp Clik - "Ice Skate" (2002)
Busta Rhymes featuring Nas - "Rough Around The Edges"
Cassidy featuring Bone Thugs-N-Harmony & Eve - "Cash Rulez" (2007)
King Chip - Sprinkle Me (2009) (The Cleveland Show)
Cocoa Brovaz - "Get Up" (2001)
Cocoa Brovaz featuring Dawn Penn - "Spit Again"
Common featuring Sadat X - "1-9-9-9" (Album: Rawkus presents Soundbombing II)  (1999)
Common - "Tekzilla"
Cormega - "Take These Jewels" (2002)
D12 - "Just Like You" (Album: D12 World) (2004)
Dead Prez featuring Talib Kweli - "Sharp Shooters"
Donte - "Heat 4 The Streets"
The Game - Runnin'
G-Unit - "G Unit", "Eye For An Eye" (Album: Beg For Mercy)
Ghostface Killah - "Josephine" (Album: More Fish)
Gym Class Heroes - "New Friend Request (Hi-Tek Remix)" (Album: Snakes On A Plane: The Album)
Hodgy - "Glory" (Album: Fireplace: TheNotTheOtherSide) (2016)
J Dilla - "The Creep (The O)"; "Gangsta Boogie" (Album: The Diary) (2016)
J. Sands - "In Jail"
Jonell - "Don't Stop"; "Round & Round (remix)"
Kurious - "Brand New Day" (featuring Dave Dar & Co Campbell)(2009)
Little Brother - "Step it Up"  (featuring Dion) (Album: Getback)
Lloyd Banks featuring Snoop Dogg, 50 Cent - "I Get High" (Album: The Hunger for More)
M-Dot - "Days Are All The Same" (Album: Ego And The Enemy) (2017)
Mood - Doom
Mood - "Illuminated Sunz" (Album: Concealed Revelations) (2016)
Morcheeba featuring Talib Kweli - "Let Me See (remix)"
Mos Def - "Next Universe" (Album: Rawkus presents Soundbombing II)
Outlawz featuring Young Buck & Dion - "Drivin' Down the Freeway" (Album: Godz Plan)
Papoose - "What Makes Me, Me" (Album: Internationally Known)
Phife Dawg - 4 tracks from Ventilation: Da LP
Phife Dawg - "Miscellaneous (remix)"
Planet Asia & Grand Agent  - "It's Only Right"
Rick Dolo - Pan Am
Slum Village - "The Set Up" (Album: Villa Manifesto)
Snoop Dogg - "I Believe In You", "I Miss That Bitch" (Album: Paid tha Cost to Be da Boss)
Snoop Dogg - "No Thang On Me" {Album: R&G (Rhythm & Gangsta): The Masterpiece 
Soopafly - "Are You Ready"
Soulive featuring Talib Kweli - "Bridge to Bama (remix)"
Styles P featuring Ray J - "Let's Go" (Album: Super Gangster, Extraordinary Gentleman)
Styles P featuring Talib Kweli - "Testify" (Album: Time Is Money)
Syleena Johnson - "Hit On Me (remix)" (Album: Chapter 1: Love, Pain & Forgiveness), "The Voice/Intro", "Outro" (Album: Chapter 2: The Voice)
Talib Kweli - "2000 Seasons", "The Express", "Back Up Offa Me", "Work It Out", "Beautiful Struggle", "More or Less"
Termanology - "In The Streets" (Album: Politics as Usual)
 Termanology - ""Where's The Love" (featuring Bun B, Bodega Bamz, and Masspike Miles) (Album: "More Politics")
Tha Eastsidaz "Cool", "Eastside Ridaz" (Album: Duces 'n Trayz: The Old Fashioned Way)
The Game - "Runnin'" (Album: The Documentary), "Ol English" (Album: Doctor's Advocate), "Letter To The King" (Album: L.A.X)
Truth Hurts - "Hollywood"
Xzibit - "Scent of a Woman" (Album: Weapons of Mass Destruction)
Xzibit featuring Busta Rhymes - "Tough Guy" (Album: Weapons of Mass Destruction)
Young Buck - "Don't Need No Help" (Album: Get Rich Or Die Tryin' soundtrack)
Young Buck featuring Snoop Dogg, Trick Daddy - "I Ain't Fuckin' Wit You" (Album: Buck the World)
9th Wonder and Talib Kweli featuring Rapsody - "Every Ghetto" (Album: Indie 500)

References

1976 births
Living people
African-American rappers
Midwest hip hop musicians
American hip hop record producers
Aftermath Entertainment artists
African-American record producers
Rappers from Cincinnati
21st-century American rappers
21st-century African-American musicians
20th-century African-American people